Colkirk is a village (population 2001-547) situated about two miles south of Fakenham in the county of Norfolk, England. Dating from at least the time of the Domesday Book. The village including Oxwick , Pattesley and South Raynham currently (2011) has  588 inhabitants living in  266 dwellings. The village has a church, (St. Mary's), in the north west corner of the village, a Village Hall, a church pond (known as the Church Pit in Norfolk dialect), a Camping Land (land once used for the game Camping, "camp" meaning battle in Old English). There is also a thriving village school for students from the age of four to eleven, a lively village Pub called "The Crown" and a playing field for soccer, cricket, rounders and school sports days.

The village lies close to the source of the River Wensum which is between Colkirk, Oxwick and Whissonsett.

History

The name Colkirk is an Anglo-Saxon or Danish word, meaning "the church of Cola", from "kirk" meaning church and "Cola" being the name of the builder or first owner of a church perhaps over a thousand years ago. The present church may possibly be on the same site as the original building and is of medieval origin.

At the time of the Domesday Book, the whole estate of the manor of Colkirk belonged to the bishop. At that time the cathedral was at North Elmham and the Domesday Book records how much land the bishop held in Colkirk, how many sheep and pigs he kept and how many people worked on his estate.

Details of the original moated manor house and buildings, which included a dovecote and private chapel and was situated near Long's Lane off Dereham Road, were described in a document of 1296.

Soon after the cathedral was established in Norwich in 1101, the Bishop gave Colkirk to one of the knights of his private army. This knight named himself after the village "Richard of Colkirk" and he and his successors lived at the manor house until 600 years ago, after which the house within the moat was allowed to fall into decay.

About 400 years ago in the reign of Queen Elizabeth I, the village began to look more like the Colkirk of today. Brick and flint started to replace timber framed wattle and clay as building materials. Some of the earliest brick and flint houses remain today, "Starre" and "Gable End" being among the oldest houses in the village and Colkirk Hall was built towards the end of the reign of Queen Elizabeth I around 1595. The Timperley family were one of the first recorded occupants of the Hall. The Timperley family, after whom the Timperley Estate was named, fell on hard times and lost most of their land as a penalty for helping to defend King's Lynn against Oliver Cromwell's troops in 1643. Colkirk Hall was subsequently bought by Marquis Townshend, since when it has been occupied as a farm house.

Other changes were taking place in Colkirk at this time. One by one the small farmers who comprised the village population were becoming poor and sold their land to richer men. In this way there came to be just a few big farms in the village as there are today. With the formation of the big farms came the division of the old, big village fields into the smaller fields, bounded by hedges, which still exist today. All the land in the Parish was finally brought into use when the commons were enclosed and the big woods cut down about 150 years ago.

The period 1820 to 1845 saw a population increase in the village and a number of houses were built or rebuilt about this time. These houses can be recognised as they were generally of red brick, rather than flint. The "Crown" was rebuilt by the Parish in 1827 and Colkirk House was built in 1837.

Since then, most of the houses on the right hand side of School Road were built as model cottages, by Canon Hoare, when he was Rector of Colkirk. The School was rebuilt in 1851 and the Infants' Room added in 1894. A Chapel was established in the village in the 1830s; however, the building erected in 1875 has now been demolished.

There was a Co-op in the village founded 120 years ago, having occupied three different sites in its time and finally situated in Dereham Road was closed in the 1960s.

Other facilities, which were once part of village life and have passed into history, include a Pork Butcher's Shop, a General Store and a Carpenter and Undertaker, all on Hall Lane, together with a Blacksmith and a Baker's Shop on Dereham Road. The last to be closed being the Village Shop and Post Office which was on the junction of Dereham Road and Crown Road.

The Village Hall was built some 140 years ago by one of the Rectors of Colkirk and is now owned by the Parish.

Census population figures for the village show little change during the latter part of the 19th century and at around 450 are about 100 fewer than the present day.

In the 1883 Kelly's Directory described the village thus:

COLKIRK is a parish about two miles south from Fakenham, in the Western division of the county, Launditch hundred, union of Mitford and Launditch, county court district of East Dereham, rural deanery of Toftrees and archdeaconry and diocese of Norwich: the village is situated on a height, commanding a fine prospect. The church of St. Mary the Virgin is a small plain Gothic building of flint consisting of chancel, nave and north aisle, and tower with 5 bells, and contains memorials to the Timperley and other families: there are several stained windows. The register dates from the year 1538. The living is a rectory, consolidated with Oxwick, joint yearly value £800, with residence, in the gift of and held since 1868 by the Rev. Walter Marsham Hoare M.A. of Exeter College, Oxford. The charities amount to £30 yearly, principally for fuel. The Marquis Townshend is lord of the manor and principal landowner. The soil is mixed; subsoil, clay. The chief crops are wheat, turnips and barley. The area is 1,482 acres (6 km2); rateable value, £2,508; and the population in 1881 was 431.

The following people are listed as tradespersons in the village:

PARISH CLERK – Mr William Smith

POST OFFICE – Mr William Thompson

NATIONAL SCHOOL – Miss H. Harrold, mistress

ST. MARYS CHURCH – Reverend Walter Marsham Hoare M.A.

COLKIRK HOUSE – Mr Stephen Ratcliffe Pope

COMMERCIAL
Mr Jones Abraham – shoe maker; Mrs Mary Chambers – Farmer, The Hall; Mr William Farrow – Shopkeeper; Mr Thomas Richard Goggs – Farmer; Mr George Harper – Basket Maker; Mrs Ann Howard – Grocer; Mr. John Howe – Publican, The Crown; Mr. James Nelson – Carpenter; Miss Elizabeth Raven and Miss Mary Ann Raven – Farmers; Mr John Rutland – Jobbing Gardener; Mr Charles Smith – Farmer; Mr Charles Spinks – Baker; Mr William Thompson – Carpenter & Post Office; Mr Matthew Wright – Beer Retailer & Blacksmith;

References

  Office for National Statistics & Norfolk County Council, 2001. "Census population and household counts for unparished urban areas and all parishes."
  Much of this text is from a 1961 presentation to Colkirk Women's Institute by Paul Rutledge.

External links

 Parish Website

Villages in Norfolk
Breckland District
Civil parishes in Norfolk